Calan is a small town in the commune in the Morbihan department of the region of Brittany in north-western France.

Demographics
Inhabitants of Calan are called Calanais.

See also
Communes of the Morbihan department

References

External links

 Cultural Heritage 
 Mayors of Morbihan Association 

Communes of Morbihan